There have been two political parties in Canada that have used the name Family Coalition Party:
 Family Coalition Party of British Columbia (1991–2000)
 New Reform Party of Ontario (1987 - present), a minor provincial political party in Ontario, Canada previously known as the Family Coalition Party of Ontario